The arrondissement of Mamers is an arrondissement of France in the Sarthe department in the Pays de la Loire region. It has 191 communes.

Composition

The communes of the arrondissement of Mamers, and their INSEE codes, are:

Aillières-Beauvoir (72002) 
Ancinnes (72005) 
Arçonnay (72006) 
Ardenay-sur-Mérize (72007) 
Assé-le-Boisne (72011) 
Assé-le-Riboul (72012) 
Les Aulneaux (72015) 
Avesnes-en-Saosnois (72018) 
Avezé (72020) 
Beaufay (72026) 
Beaumont-sur-Sarthe (72029) 
Beillé (72031) 
Berfay (72032) 
Bernay-Neuvy-en-Champagne (72219) 
Bérus (72034) 
Bessé-sur-Braye (72035) 
Béthon (72036) 
Blèves (72037) 
Boëssé-le-Sec (72038) 
Bonnétable (72039) 
La Bosse (72040) 
Bouër (72041) 
Bouloire (72042) 
Bourg-le-Roi (72043) 
Le Breil-sur-Mérize (72046) 
Briosne-lès-Sables (72048) 
Champfleur (72056) 
Champrond (72057) 
La Chapelle-du-Bois (72062) 
La Chapelle-Huon (72064) 
La Chapelle-Saint-Fray (72066) 
La Chapelle-Saint-Rémy (72067) 
Chenay (72076) 
Chérancé (72078) 
Chérisay (72079) 
Cherré-Au (72080) 
Cogners (72085) 
Commerveil (72086) 
Conflans-sur-Anille (72087) 
Congé-sur-Orne (72088) 
Conlie (72089) 
Connerré (72090) 
Contilly (72091) 
Cormes (72093) 
Coudrecieux (72094) 
Courcemont (72101) 
Courcival (72102) 
Courgains (72104) 
Courgenard (72105) 
Crissé (72109) 
Cures (72111) 
Dangeul (72112) 
Degré (72113) 
Dehault (72114) 
Dollon (72118) 
Domfront-en-Champagne (72119) 
Doucelles (72120) 
Douillet (72121) 
Duneau (72122) 
Écorpain (72125) 
Fatines (72129) 
La Ferté-Bernard (72132) 
Fresnay-sur-Sarthe (72138) 
Fyé (72139) 
Gesnes-le-Gandelin (72141) 
Grandchamp (72142) 
Gréez-sur-Roc (72144) 
Le Grez (72145) 
Jauzé (72148) 
Juillé (72152) 
Lamnay (72156) 
Lavardin (72157) 
Lavaré (72158) 
Livet-en-Saosnois (72164) 
Lombron (72165) 
Louvigny (72170) 
Louzes (72171) 
Le Luart (72172) 
Lucé-sous-Ballon (72174) 
Maisoncelles (72178) 
Mamers (72180) 
Maresché (72186) 
Marolles-les-Braults (72189) 
Marolles-lès-Saint-Calais (72190) 
Marollette (72188) 
Les Mées (72192) 
Melleray (72193) 
Meurcé (72194) 
Mézières-sous-Lavardin (72197) 
Mézières-sur-Ponthouin (72196) 
Moitron-sur-Sarthe (72199) 
Moncé-en-Saosnois (72201) 
Monhoudou (72202) 
Montaillé (72204) 
Montfort-le-Gesnois (72241) 
Montmirail (72208) 
Montreuil-le-Chétif (72209) 
Mont-Saint-Jean (72211) 
Moulins-le-Carbonnel (72212) 
Nauvay (72214) 
Neufchâtel-en-Saosnois (72215) 
Neuvillalais (72216) 
Neuvillette-en-Charnie (72218) 
Nogent-le-Bernard (72220) 
Nouans (72222) 
Nuillé-le-Jalais (72224) 
Oisseau-le-Petit (72225) 
Panon (72227) 
Parennes (72229) 
Peray (72233) 
Pezé-le-Robert (72234) 
Piacé (72235) 
Pizieux (72238) 
Préval (72245) 
Prévelles (72246) 
La Quinte (72249) 
Rahay (72250) 
René (72251) 
Rouessé-Fontaine (72254) 
Rouessé-Vassé (72255) 
Rouez (72256) 
Rouperroux-le-Coquet (72259) 
Ruillé-en-Champagne (72261) 
Saint-Aignan (72265) 
Saint-Aubin-de-Locquenay (72266) 
Saint-Aubin-des-Coudrais (72267) 
Saint-Calais (72269) 
Saint-Calez-en-Saosnois (72270) 
Saint-Célerin (72271) 
Saint-Christophe-du-Jambet (72273) 
Saint-Corneille (72275) 
Saint-Cosme-en-Vairais (72276) 
Saint-Denis-des-Coudrais (72277) 
Sainte-Cérotte (72272) 
Sainte-Sabine-sur-Longève (72319) 
Saint-Georges-du-Rosay (72281) 
Saint-Georges-le-Gaultier (72282) 
Saint-Gervais-de-Vic (72286) 
Saint-Jean-des-Échelles (72292) 
Saint-Léonard-des-Bois (72294) 
Saint-Longis (72295) 
Saint-Maixent (72296) 
Saint-Marceau (72297) 
Saint-Mars-de-Locquenay (72298) 
Saint-Mars-la-Brière (72300) 
Saint-Martin-des-Monts (72302) 
Saint-Michel-de-Chavaignes (72303) 
Saint-Ouen-de-Mimbré (72305) 
Saint Paterne - Le Chevain (72308) 
Saint-Paul-le-Gaultier (72309) 
Saint-Pierre-des-Ormes (72313) 
Saint-Rémy-de-Sillé (72315) 
Saint-Rémy-des-Monts (72316) 
Saint-Rémy-du-Val (72317) 
Saint-Symphorien (72321) 
Saint-Ulphace (72322) 
Saint-Victeur (72323) 
Saint-Vincent-des-Prés (72324) 
Saosnes (72326) 
Savigné-l'Évêque (72329) 
Sceaux-sur-Huisne (72331) 
Ségrie (72332) 
Semur-en-Vallon (72333) 
Sillé-le-Guillaume (72334) 
Sillé-le-Philippe (72335) 
Sougé-le-Ganelon (72337) 
Soulitré (72341) 
Souvigné-sur-Même (72342) 
Surfonds (72345) 
Tennie (72351) 
Terrehault (72352) 
Théligny (72353) 
Thoigné (72354) 
Thoiré-sous-Contensor (72355) 
Thorigné-sur-Dué (72358) 
Torcé-en-Vallée (72359) 
Tresson (72361) 
Le Tronchet (72362) 
Tuffé-Val-de-la-Chéronne (72363) 
Val-d'Étangson (72128) 
Valennes (72366) 
Vancé (72368) 
Vernie (72370) 
Vezot (72372) 
Vibraye (72373) 
Villaines-la-Carelle (72374) 
Villaines-la-Gonais (72375) 
Villeneuve-en-Perseigne (72137) 
Vivoin (72380) 
Volnay (72382) 
Vouvray-sur-Huisne (72383)

History

The arrondissement of Mamers was created in 1800. In February 2006 it absorbed the six cantons of Bouloire, Conlie, Montfort-le-Gesnois, Saint-Calais, Sillé-le-Guillaume and Vibraye from the arrondissement of Le Mans. In August 2012 the commune Champagné passed from the arrondissement of Mamers to the arrondissement of Le Mans, and the communes Beaufay, Courcemont and Savigné-l'Évêque passed from the arrondissement of Le Mans to the arrondissement of Mamers.

As a result of the reorganisation of the cantons of France which came into effect in 2015, the borders of the cantons are no longer related to the borders of the arrondissements. The cantons of the arrondissement of Mamers were, as of January 2015:

 Beaumont-sur-Sarthe
 Bonnétable
 Bouloire
 Conlie
 La Ferté-Bernard
 La Fresnaye-sur-Chédouet
 Fresnay-sur-Sarthe
 Mamers
 Marolles-les-Braults
 Montfort-le-Gesnois
 Montmirail
 Saint-Calais
 Saint-Paterne
 Sillé-le-Guillaume
 Tuffé
 Vibraye

References

Mamers